Leon Henry Vaessen (born 8 November 1940) was an English professional footballer of the 1950s and 1960s. He made over 50 appearances in The Football League.

Playing career
Born in New Cross, he joined Chelsea as a youngster, but was not offered a professional contract.  In January 1958 he signed for Millwall and went on to make 26 Football League appearances for the "Lions", but never established himself as a regular starter.  At the end of the 1960–61 season, he was transferred to Gillingham.  He was initially a regular in the team, but fell out of favour, playing just once in the 1962–63 season, before being sold to Dover for a fee of £500.  His last known club was Crawley Town.

Family
His mother was English and his father was Dutch. His son Paul played for Arsenal but was forced to retire due to injury and fell into a life of crime and drug addiction before dying at the age of 39 in 2001.

References

1940 births
Living people
Footballers from New Cross
Association football midfielders
English footballers
Chelsea F.C. players
Millwall F.C. players
Gillingham F.C. players
Dover F.C. players
Crawley Town F.C. players
English Football League players
English people of Dutch descent